The 1968 Western Kentucky football team represented Western Kentucky University during the 1968 NCAA College Division football season. The team was led by coach Jimmy Feix, in his first season as coach, the Hilltoppers compiled an overall record of 7–2–1 with a mark of 5–2 in conference play, placing second in the OVC. The team's captain was Walt Heath.

Schedule

References

Western Kentucky
Western Kentucky Hilltoppers football seasons
Western Kentucky Hilltoppers football